Flitterwochen ohne Ehemann is an East German television film. It was released in 1961.

External links
 

1961 films
1961 television films
East German films
Television in East Germany
1960s German-language films
German-language television shows
German television films